Al Green Explores Your Mind is the eighth album by soul singer Al Green. Unlike previous Al Green albums, this album featured only one major hit, the U.S. #7 hit "Sha-La-La (Make Me Happy)", but did contain the original version of "Take Me to the River", a song which went to #26 on the Billboard chart when covered by Talking Heads in 1978. In 2004, the song "Take Me to the River" was ranked number 117 on Rolling Stone magazine's list of the 500 greatest songs of all time.

The album was his fifth consecutive album to claim #1 on the Soul Albums chart, and peaked at #15 on the Pop Albums chart.

Track listing
All tracks composed by Al Green; except where indicated
Side one
 "Sha-La-La (Make Me Happy)" – 3:01
 "Take Me to the River" (Green, Mabon "Teenie" Hodges) – 3:45
 "God Blessed Our Love" (Green, Willie Mitchell, Earl Randle) – 3:57
 "The City" (Green, Charles Hodges) – 3:25
 "One Nite Stand" – 2:26

Side two
 "I'm Hooked on You" (Green, Mitchell) – 3:22
 "Stay with Me Forever" (Green, Anne Sanders) – 3:15
 "Hangin' On" (Green, Michael Allen) – 4:21
 "School Days" – 3:14

Personnel
Al Green – vocals
Mabon "Teenie" Hodges – guitar
Leroy Hodges – bass guitar
Charles Hodges – Hammond organ, piano
Howard Grimes – drums, congas
Archie Turner, Michael Allen – piano
Charles Chalmers, Donna Rhodes, Sandra Rhodes – backing vocals
Andrew Love, Ed Logan – tenor saxophone
James Mitchell – baritone saxophone, string arrangements
Wayne Jackson – trumpet
Jack Hale, Sr. – trombone
The Memphis Strings - strings
Technical
Glenn Ross, Richard Kriegler - art direction, design
Bob Levy, Buddy Rosenberg - photography

See also
List of Billboard number-one R&B albums of 1975

References

1974 albums
Al Green albums
Albums produced by Willie Mitchell (musician)
Hi Records albums